Datarpur is a village situated in Mukerian Tehsil, Hoshiarpur District, Punjab (India). Datarpur State was a small precolonial Indian hill state in the Lower Himalayas. The state was founded around 1550 and was annexed by the Sikh Empire in 1818.

Nearest city to the village is Talwara, famous for a hydro power project owned by BBMB. From ancient times Datarpur has been the center of business and education in the area.

Datarpur is famous for its spiritual centers, ancient Dushera Festival and market.

Spiritual places
Datarpur has spiritual centers including:

1) Darbar Shri Bawa Lal Dyal ji (one of 22 ancient gaddis of bawa lal ji)
2) Mandir Shri Sesh Nag ji  (4 km from datarpur in Bindraban Village )
3 ) Prachin Sankatmochan Hanuman ji Mandir .
4) Darbar Baba Dayalu Ji Maharaj (6 km from datarpur in Fatehpur Village )
5) Baba Ishwar Das ji (3 km from Datarpur in Repur Village) & more

History

Datarpur State was founded in the middle of the sixteenth century by Raja Datar Chand, a scion of the princely families of Siba and Guler who named the state after himself. From 1786 the state was a feudatory of Kangra State until Raja Govind Chand made an alliance with the Gurkha invaders from Nepal in 1806, securing his complete independence.
Govind Chand was succeeded by his son Jagat Chand when Datarpur was conquered by Ranjit Singh of Lahore in 1818 and annexed to the Sikh Empire of Pañjab (Punjab), although a jagir was granted to Jagat Chand as compensation. In 1848, Jagat Chand joined a rebellion against the British and was deposed, dispossessed and exiled to Almora. The territory of Datarpur was added to Siba State and annexed by the British Raj in 1849 as Dada-Siba. The descendants of Jagat Chand were given no jagir, but the royal house still exists.

Rulers

They bore the title 'Raja'.

Rajas
ca. 1550 – ... 	Datar Chand
 ... – ...              Ganesh Chand
 ... – ...              Chatar Chand
 ... – ...              Udai Chand
 ... – ...              Prithi Chand
 ... – ...              Jai Chand
 ... – ...              Dalel Chand
 ... – ...              Ugar Chand
 ... –1806                Nand Chand
1806–1818	            Govind Chand 
1818–1848               Jagat Chand - in rebellion (died 1877)

See also
List of Rajput dynasties
Siba State

References

External links
Datarpur location

States and territories established in the 1550s
Princely states of India
History of Punjab
Hindu dynasties
Historical Hindu empires
Hoshiarpur district
Rajputs
1550s establishments in India
1849 disestablishments in India